Pirəbbə (also, Pirappa) is a village in the Neftchala District of Azerbaijan. The village forms part of the municipality of Yukhary Garamanly.

References 

Populated places in Neftchala District